WCEM-FM (106.3 MHz, "Coast Country 103.9/106.3") is a radio station playing a country music format. It broadcasts from Cambridge, Maryland. It is owned by the Draper Holdings Business Trust, as part of a cluster with CBS/Fox affiliate WBOC-TV (channel 16), NBC affiliate WRDE-LD (channel 31), Telemundo affiliate WBOC-LD (channel 42), and sister radio stations WBOC-FM, WTDK, WCEM, WAAI and WRDE-FM. The station broadcasts from its studios in Cambridge Marketplace. WCEM-FM's transmitter is located in Cambridge.

In addition to its usual music programming, WCEM-FM broadcasts Baltimore Ravens games and little league baseball all-star games during the summer.

History
The station was assigned the call letters WCEM-FM on 1968-01-29. On 1981-06-01, the station changed its call sign to WESP-FM.  On 1983-11-01, the station changed its call sign to the current WCEM-FM.

On March 4, 2022, WCEM rebranded as "Coast Country 103.9/106.3", with a simulcast of WRDE-FM 103.9 FM Berlin.

Previous logo

References

External links

CEM-FM
Cambridge, Maryland
CEM-FM